Kostelec na Hané is a town in Prostějov District in the Olomouc Region of the Czech Republic. It has about 2,900 inhabitants.

Geography
It lies mostly in the Upper Morava Valley. The Romže River flows through the town.

History
The first written mention of Kostelec na Hané is in a deed of bishop Jindřich Zdík from 1141. In the 13th century, it was owned by Duke Nicholas I as a part of the Plumlov estate. He sold the estate to King John of Bohemia in 1311, who sold it to the Lords of Kravaře in 1325. The Lords of Kravaře held it to 1466. In 1466, the estate was acquired by marriage by Herald of Kunštát, and after his death in 1490 it was acquired by the Pernštejn family. In 1595, the estate passed into possession of the House of Liechtenstein, who held it until 1848.

Demographics

Transport
Kostelec na Hané lies on the railway line of local importance leading from Prostějov to Dzbel.

Sights

The landmark of Kostelec na Hané is the Church of Saint James the Great. It was built in the Baroque style in 1772.

Červený domek ("Red House") is a house where Petr Bezruč lived until his death. Today there is an exposition about his life and work.

Notable people
Petr Bezruč (1867–1958), poet; lived here in 1939–1958
Jan Nehera (1899–1958), businessman
Karel Otáhal (1901–1972), sculptor

References

External links

Cities and towns in the Czech Republic
Populated places in Prostějov District